Strange and Beautiful may refer to:

 Strange and Beautiful (Aqualung album), 2005
 "Strange & Beautiful (I'll Put a Spell on You)", a song by Aqualung from Aqualung (Aqualung album), 2002
 Strange and Beautiful (Crimson Glory album), 1991